East Chicago Central High School or commonly known as Central or EC Central, is a public high school in the industrial City of East Chicago, located east of the Chicago metropolitan area.

History
The School City of East Chicago built East Chicago Central High School in 1986 to replace East Chicago's two aging high schools, East Chicago Washington and East Chicago Roosevelt High Schools. East Chicago Central's first semester began in the fall of 1986.

Academics 
East Chicago Central High School is ranked 293rd out of the 397 high schools of Indiana and #12,248 in National Rankings. Central had an average composite ACT score of 22 and has a 69% graduation rate (State graduation rate average is 86%). Central students' proficiency in math is 12% (Lower than the Indiana state average of 54%). Students' proficiency in reading/language arts is 33% (Lower than the Indiana state average of 62%). Central High School placed in the bottom 50% of all schools in Indiana for overall test scores (Math proficiency is bottom 50%, and reading proficiency is bottom 50%).

Athletics
The athletic director was Cindy Wilson.

The East Chicago Central's Cardinals compete in the Great Lakes Conference (GLC) as well as in the state championship series sponsored by the Indiana High School Athletic Association (IHSAA) which governs athletic activities in Indiana. School colors are Cardinal red and Navy blue.

The school sponsors interscholastic teams for both boys and girls in Basketball, Coed Flag Football, Coed Track, Cross Country, Soccer, Swimming & Diving, and Tennis. Girls also compete in Volleyball. Boys also compete in Baseball, Football, Golf and Wrestling.

East Chicago Central athletic teams placed in the top four of their respective class in their respective sports in IHSAA sponsored state championship series:

 Basketball (Boys): State Champions  (EC Washington: 1960*, 1971*) (EC Roosevelt: 1970*) (EC Central: 2007)  Semi-State Champions:  (EC Washington: 1947*, 1960*, 1962*, 1966*, 1971*, 1976*, 1977*, 1985*)  Regional Champions: (EC Washington: 1925*, 1927*, 1928*, 1929*, 1930*, 1931*, 1936*, 1940*, 1941*, 1942*, 1944*, 1953*, 1963*, 1967*, 1978*, 1979*, 1983*)  Sectional Champions: (EC Central: 1987, 19889, 1991, 1992, 1993, 1994, 1995, 2001, 2003, 2004, 2006, 2007, 2008, 2016, 2017)
Basketball (Girls): State Champions (EC Roosevelt: 1977*, 1979*)
 Football: State Champions (EC Roosevelt: 1945*, 1946*, 1949*, 1955*, 1957*)   (EC Central: 1994, 2017)
 Wrestling: State Champions (EC Roosevelt: 1934*) 

*Indicates titles won by East Chicago Washington High School and East Chicago Roosevelt High School prior to merging in 1986 to become East Chicago Central High School.

John A. Baratto Athletic Center 
The John A. Baratto Athletic Center is the third-largest high school basketball gym by seating capacity in the United States with 8,054 seats, behind Lloyd E. Scott Gymnasium at Seymour High School (capacity: 8,228) and New Castle Fieldhouse at New Castle High School (capacity: 8,424), both of which are also in Indiana.

The gym was dedicated in 1988 and is named in honor of legendary EC Washington basketball coach John Baratto, who went 484-170, secured 15 sectional titles, 8 regional titles, 4 semi-state crowns, and the 1960 IHSAA basketball title. Baratto was inducted into the Indiana Basketball Hall of Fame in 1972.

Demographics 
The racial makeup of students attending Central is 51% Hispanic, 47% African-American, 2% White, and 1% Two or More Races. The gender makeup is 48% female and 52% male.

Notable alumni
 Monica Maxwell - Former WNBA player, former assistant coach at Pike High School
 E'Twaun Moore- NBA Player, currently playing for the Orlando Magic
 Kawann Short - NFL player, formerly played for Carolina Panthers, current free agent
 Miguel Torres - Former MMA fighter

See also
 List of high schools in Indiana
 Largest high school gyms in the United States

References

External links
 East Chicago Central High School

Public high schools in Indiana
Schools in Lake County, Indiana
Educational institutions established in 1986
East Chicago, Indiana
1986 establishments in Indiana